Henry Richardson (August 26, 1917 – July 10, 1981) was an American baseball pitcher in the Negro leagues. He played with the Washington Black Senators and the Pittsburgh Crawfords in 1938. His career is sometimes combined with Tom Richardson.

References

External links
 and Seamheads

Pittsburgh Crawfords players
Washington Black Senators players
1917 births
1981 deaths
Baseball players from Alabama
Baseball pitchers
20th-century African-American sportspeople